Ezio Gamba (born 2 December 1958) is a retired judoka from Italy, who represented his native country at four consecutive Summer Olympics (1976, 1980, 1984 and 1988). He claimed the gold medal in the men's lightweight division (– 71 kg) in 1980 by defeating Great Britain's Neil Adams.

Biography
Four years later in Los Angeles, California, Gamba won the silver medal in the same weight division, after being defeated by South Korea's Ahn Byeong-Keun in the final.

He is the current trainer of the Russian National Judo team. In 2013, for his great contribution to the development of sports in the Russian Federation Gamba was awarded the Russian Order of Friendship.

In early January 2016, he was granted Russian citizenship by President of Russia Vladimir Putin.

International medals
Gold
 82 European Championships (71 kg) -  Rostock, Germany
 80 Olympic Games (71 kg) - Moscow, Russia
 80 Dutch Open (71 kg) – Den Haag, Holland* 

Silver
 88 European Championships (71 kg) - Paris, France, defeating G. Gevechanov from Bulgaria
 84 Olympic Games (71 kg) - Los Angeles, CA, USA
 83 World Championships (71 kg) - Moscow, Russia
 83 European Championships (71 kg) - Paris, France
 79 World Championships (71 kg) - Paris, France
 79 European Championships (71 kg) - Brussels, Belgium
 78 Jr. European Championships (71 kg) – Miskolc, Hungary
 77 Jr. European Championships (71 kg) – Berlin, Germany
 76 Jr. World Championships (78 kg) - Madrid, Spain

Bronze
 86 European Championships (71 kg) – Belgrade, Yugoslavia

References

External links
 
 
 Profile

1958 births
Living people
Italian male judoka
Judoka at the 1976 Summer Olympics
Judoka at the 1980 Summer Olympics
Judoka at the 1984 Summer Olympics
Judoka at the 1988 Summer Olympics
Olympic judoka of Italy
Olympic gold medalists for Italy
Olympic silver medalists for Italy
Sportspeople from Brescia
Olympic medalists in judo
Naturalised citizens of Russia
Medalists at the 1984 Summer Olympics
Medalists at the 1980 Summer Olympics
Honoured Coaches of Russia
Judoka of Centro Sportivo Carabinieri
20th-century Italian people
21st-century Italian people